Goldie is a given name used in reference to an informal English diminutive word for gold or an English version of the Yiddish name Golda or Golde, also meaning gold. It is also used as a nickname for formal names such as Marigold. It has a “vintage vibe” for some parents who have considered it. Other commentators note that the name has risen in use for girls along with other names of a similar style that all exude cuteness and promote enjoyment, perhaps in reaction to serious times. It was among the one thousand most used names for girls in the United States between 1880 and 1940, then declined in use. It has increased in usage in recent years and was among the one thousand most used names for newborn American girls in 2021. 

Notable people with the name include:

 Goldie Alexander (1936–2020), Australian author
 Goldie Behl (born 1975), Indian filmmaker
 Goldie Brangman-Dumpson (1920-2020), African-American nurse and educator
 Red Burns (1925–2013), Canadian-born American educator
 Goldie Cephus (1898-1983), African-American baseball outfielder
 Goldie Collins (1901–1982), Australian rules footballer
 Goldie Colwell (1889-1982), American film actress
 Goldie Davis, American baseball player
 Goldie Ghamari (born 1985), Canadian politician
 Goldie Goldbloom (born 1964), Australian novelist
 Goldie Goldthorpe (born 1953), Canadian ice hockey player
 Goldie Harvey (1981–2013), Nigerian singer
 Goldie Hawn (born 1945), American actress
 Goldie Hershon (1941–2020), Canadian human rights activist
 Goldie Hill (1933–2005), American singer
 Goldie Holt (1902–1991), American professional baseball player
 Goldie Milgram (born 1955), American rabbi
 Goldie Morgentaler (born 1950), Canadian translator
 Goldie Rapp (1892–1966), American professional baseball player
 Goldie Rogers (1950–2012), Canadian professional wrestler
 Goldie Sayers (born 1982), British track and field athlete
 Goldie Sellers (1942–2020), American football player
 Goldie Semple (1952–2009), Canadian actress
 Goldie Taylor (born 1968), American author
 Goldie Thomas (1885–1972), Australian cricketer

Fictional characters 
 Goldie Luxe, from the toyline Lalaloopsy
 Goldie the Sunshine Fairy, from the book series Rainbow Magic

See also
Goldie (disambiguation), for people known by the nickname "Goldie"
Golda (disambiguation)

Notes